Arrhyton is a genus of New World snakes, commonly known as island racers or racerlets, in the family Colubridae. The genus contains 9 described species.

Geographic range
All species in the genus Arrhyton are endemic to Cuba.

Species
The following species are recognized as being valid.
Arrhyton ainictum  – Cuban island racer
Arrhyton albicollum  – Gibara white-collared racerlet
Arrhyton dolichura  – Habana island racer
Arrhyton procerum  – Zapata long-tailed groundsnake
Arrhyton redimitum  – Oriente brown-capped racerlet
Arrhyton supernum  – Oriente black groundsnake
Arrhyton taeniatum  – Günther's island racer
Arrhyton tanyplectum  – San Vincente island racer
Arrhyton vittatum  – common island racer

References

Further reading
Boulenger GA (1894). Catalogue of the Snakes in the British Museum (Natural History). Volume II., Containing the Conclusion of the Colubridæ Aglyphæ. London: Trustees of the British Museum (Natural History). (Taylor and Francis, printers). xi + 382 pp. + Plates I-XX. (Genus Arrhyton, p. 251).
Günther A (1858). Catalogue of Colubrine Snakes in the Collection of the British Museum. London: Trustees of the British Museum. (Taylor and Francis, printers). xvi + 281 pp. (Arrhyton, new genus, p. 240, 244).
Schwartz A, Thomas R (1975). A Check-list of West Indian Amphibians and Reptiles. Carnegie Museum of Natural History Special Publication No. 1. Pittsburgh, Pennsylvania: Carnegie Museum of Natural History. 216 pp. (Arrhyton dolichurum, p. 177; A. taeniatum, p. 178; A. vittatum, pp. 178–179).

Arrhyton
Snakes of the Caribbean
Endemic fauna of Cuba
Reptiles of Cuba
Snake genera
Taxa named by Albert Günther